Chaetabraeus is a genus of clown beetles in the family Histeridae. There are more than 40 described species in Chaetabraeus.

Species
These 45 species belong to the genus Chaetabraeus:

 Chaetabraeus alluaudi (G.Müller, 1944)
 Chaetabraeus andrewesi Gomy, 1984
 Chaetabraeus bacanioformis (Bickhardt, 1921)
 Chaetabraeus bacchusi Gomy, 1984
 Chaetabraeus bonzicus (Marseul, 1873)
 Chaetabraeus brasavolai (G.Müller, 1944)
 Chaetabraeus chandleri Mazur, 1991
 Chaetabraeus cicatricatus (Thérond, 1959)
 Chaetabraeus cinaedus Mazur, 1997
 Chaetabraeus cohaeres (Lewis, 1898)
 Chaetabraeus connexus (Cooman, 1935)
 Chaetabraeus controversus (Cooman, 1935)
 Chaetabraeus convexus (Reitter, 1884)
 Chaetabraeus corradinii (G.Müller, 1944)
 Chaetabraeus curtulus (Fåhraeus, 1851)
 Chaetabraeus cyclonotus (Marseul, 1856)
 Chaetabraeus durandi (Thérond, 1967)
 Chaetabraeus echinaceus (Schmidt, 1895)
 Chaetabraeus fakir (Lewis, 1905)
 Chaetabraeus gandhii Gomy, 2009
 Chaetabraeus globulus (Creutzer, 1799)
 Chaetabraeus granosus (Motschulsky, 1863)
 Chaetabraeus heterocnemis Vienna, 1991
 Chaetabraeus kanaari Gomy, 1992
 Chaetabraeus lucidus (Peyerimhoff, 1917)
 Chaetabraeus masai Gomy, 2017
 Chaetabraeus misellus (Fåhraeus, 1851)
 Chaetabraeus mulleri Thérond, 1967
 Chaetabraeus nibouchei Gomy, 1996
 Chaetabraeus orientalis (Lewis, 1907)
 Chaetabraeus paria (Marseul, 1856)
 Chaetabraeus persetifer (Desbordes, 1919)
 Chaetabraeus reticulatus (Thérond, 1959)
 Chaetabraeus rugicollis (Marseul, 1856)
 Chaetabraeus sabuthomasi Gomy, 2009
 Chaetabraeus schawalleri Gomy, 1992
 Chaetabraeus setosellus (Bickhardt, 1921)
 Chaetabraeus setulosus (Fåhraeus, 1851)
 Chaetabraeus sphaericus (Marseul, 1856)
 Chaetabraeus spiculator (Thérond, 1959)
 Chaetabraeus streitoi Gomy, 1996
 Chaetabraeus subconvexus (Kryzhanovskij, 1976)
 Chaetabraeus subsetosulus (G.Müller, 1944)
 Chaetabraeus sulcatorugosus (Kanaar, 1983)
 Chaetabraeus tuberosus (Cooman, 1931)

References

Further reading

External links

 

Histeridae
Articles created by Qbugbot